Dennis Okot Oola (born 1 December 1990) is an Ugandan international footballer who plays for BIDCO Bul, as a defender.

Career
Born in Gulu, has played club football for Victoria University and Kampala Capital City Authority.

He made his international debut for Uganda in 2015.

References

1990 births
Living people
Ugandan footballers
Uganda international footballers
SC Victoria University players
Kampala Capital City Authority FC players
Onduparaka FC players
Association football defenders
Uganda A' international footballers
2016 African Nations Championship players